This article lists the confirmed national football squads for the 2006 FIFA World Cup tournament held in Germany, between 9 June and 9 July 2006. Before announcing their final squad, several teams named a provisional squad of 23 to 33 players, but each country's final squad of 23 players had to be submitted by 15 May 2006. Replacement of injured players was permitted until 24 hours before the team's first World Cup game. Players marked (c) were named as captain for their national squad. Number of caps counts until the start of the World Cup, including all pre-tournament friendlies. Club information is that used by FIFA. Players for whom this information changed during or prior to the tournament are indicated by footnotes.

Group A

Costa Rica
Head coach: Alexandre Guimarães

Ecuador
Head coach:  Luis Fernando Suárez

Germany
Head coach: Jürgen Klinsmann

Poland
Head coach: Paweł Janas

Group B

England
Head coach:  Sven-Göran Eriksson

Paraguay
Head coach:  Aníbal Ruiz

Sweden
Head coach: Lars Lagerbäck

Trinidad and Tobago
Head coach:  Leo Beenhakker

Group C

Argentina
Head coach: José Pekerman

Ivory Coast
Head coach:  Henri Michel

Netherlands
Head coach: Marco van Basten

Serbia and Montenegro
Head coach: Ilija Petković

Group D

Angola
Head coach: Oliveira Gonçalves

Iran
Head coach:  Branko Ivanković

Mexico
Head coach:  Ricardo La Volpe

Portugal
Head coach:  Luiz Felipe Scolari

Group E

Czech Republic
Head coach: Karel Brückner

Ghana
Head coach:  Ratomir Dujković

Italy
Head coach: Marcello Lippi

United States
Head coach: Bruce Arena

Group F

Australia
Head coach:  Guus Hiddink

Brazil
Head coach: Carlos Alberto Parreira

Croatia
Head coach: Zlatko Kranjčar

Japan
Head coach:  Zico

Group G

France
Head coach: Raymond Domenech

South Korea
Head coach:  Dick Advocaat

Switzerland
Head coach: Köbi Kuhn

Togo
Head coach:  Otto Pfister

Group H

Saudi Arabia
Head coach:  Marcos Paquetá

Spain
Head coach: Luis Aragonés

Tunisia
Head coach:  Roger Lemerre

Ukraine
Head coach: Oleg Blokhin

Serhiy Fedorov was injured prior to the start of the tournament. His replacement, Vyacheslav Shevchuk, was also injured shortly after filling in. Oleksandr Yatsenko was then called up, and sat on the bench for the last two matches.

Player representation by league

The squads for Italy and Saudi Arabia were made up entirely of players from their respective domestic leagues. Saudi Arabia were the only team with no players from European clubs. The Ivory Coast squad was made up entirely of players employed by foreign clubs, and 22 out of the 23 players were registered in Europe. Although Turkey, Scotland, and Russia failed to qualify for the finals, their domestic leagues were represented by 12, 11, and 10 players respectively. In total, domestic leagues from 48 countries had players at the 2006 World Cup.

Player representation by club
Finalised clubs' listing as per FIFA, excluding players on standby and loans.

References

Squads
FIFA World Cup squads